is a Japanese comedian. She is represented with Watanabe Entertainment.

Personal life
Hirano married in 2017. On 30 October 2020, she revealed she was six months pregnant with her first child and is expected to give birth in February 2021.

Filmography

TV series

Others
DVD

Discography

Singles

DVD

References

External links
 

Japanese women comedians
Japanese women's volleyball players
1978 births
Living people
Comedians from Tokyo
Watanabe Entertainment